Israel Omar Crespo (12 February 1986 – 15 September 2007) was a Puerto Rican professional boxer. He was born in Arecibo, Puerto Rico.

Amateur career 
Known as "Chiki", Crespo had an outstanding amateur career, and was the National Golden Gloves Light Flyweight Champion in 2004.

Professional career 
Crespo turned professional in 2005, fighting out of Lancaster, Pennsylvania and won his first two bouts before losing to Carlos Tamara in 2006.

Death 
Crespo was shot and killed by bullets fired from a moving car while horseback riding with friends outside Ponce, Puerto Rico.

See also 
 List of Puerto Ricans

References

External links 

1986 births
2007 deaths
American male boxers
Flyweight boxers
People from Arecibo, Puerto Rico
Puerto Rican male boxers